Spilarctia strigatula is a moth in the family Erebidae. It was described by Francis Walker in 1855. It is found in Sundaland, Thailand, Nepal and Myanmar.

The larvae feed on Dioscorea, Alternanthera, Commelina, Gerbera, Ipomoea, Musa, Paspalum, Sesbania and Vanda species.

Subspecies
Spilarctia strigatula strigatula
Spilarctia strigatula bali Dubatolov & Kishida, 2010 (Bali)

References

Moths described in 1855
strigatula